The District 6 Schoolhouse is an historic school building located at 347 Willett Avenue in East Providence, Rhode Island.  It is a single-story wood-frame structure, with a pair of entry doors and a low-pitch gable roof.  The interior has been extensively altered to meet its modern usage as a meeting space.  The school was built between 1864 and 1874, and is the oldest surviving school building in the city.

The building was listed on the National Register of Historic Places on November 28, 1980.

See also
National Register of Historic Places listings in Providence County, Rhode Island

References

School buildings completed in 1864
School buildings on the National Register of Historic Places in Rhode Island
Schoolhouses in the United States
Schools in Providence County, Rhode Island
Buildings and structures in East Providence, Rhode Island
National Register of Historic Places in Providence County, Rhode Island